Allan Emrys Blakeney  (September 7, 1925April 16, 2011) was the tenth premier of Saskatchewan from 1971 to 1982, and leader of the Saskatchewan New Democratic Party (NDP).

Early life and career
Born in Bridgewater, Nova Scotia, Blakeney took his law degree at Dalhousie Law School, winning the gold medal. He was a Rhodes Scholar at Queen's College, Oxford, where he played for the Oxford University Ice Hockey Club. He earned a bachelor's degree, second class, in politics and economics.

On returning to Canada, he passed the Nova Scotia bar exam in 1950. He then took a job with the Saskatchewan civil service, eventually becoming a senior civil servant in Saskatchewan, before he entered politics in 1960 and represented part of Regina. He would represent a Regina-based riding without interruption until his retirement in 1988.

Blakeney served as a cabinet minister in the governments of Tommy Douglas and Woodrow S. Lloyd until the government was defeated in 1964. As minister of health, he played a crucial role in the introduction of Medicare.

In 1969, Blakeney was elected national president of the New Democratic Party of Canada, and succeeded James Renwick.

NDP leader
In 1970, Blakeney succeeded Lloyd as leader of the Saskatchewan NDP, which was then in opposition. Historically, his election as leader has been interpreted as a victory of the provincial NDP's "establishment" over the left-wing Waffle faction, because Lloyd was trying to move the party more to the left and supported the Waffle Manifesto at the October 1969 federal NDP convention in Winnipeg. As well, Lloyd backed the Waffle's right to debate issues after the convention, which disturbed many of his MLAs, who eventually forced him to resign in March 1970.

Premier
In the 1971 provincial election, Blakeney led the party to power and defeated Ross Thatcher's Liberal government.

Blakeney's government practiced state-led economic intervention in the economy.

The farmers were a high priority, as globalization began transforming agriculture and weakened the traditional family farm through consolidation, 
mechanization, and corporatization. The NDP promised a "revitalized
rural Saskatchewan," and  Blakeney introduced programs to stabilize crop prices, retain transportation links, and modernize rural life. Looking back, he lamented the gradual conversion of Saskatchewan's family farms into larger agricultural ventures: without resorting to the "very high costs" and "billions of dollars" that preserved family farming in Europe and the United States, "[w]e were, it seems, King Canute trying to hold back the tide."

His government created a crown corporation in the potash industry in an attempt to further diversify the province's agrarian economy and threatened the expropriation of private potash mines in the province. Blakeney pointed out that the sums paid for the mines were slightly in excess of their appraised "book" value. However, the mere threat of expropriation created a political firestorm that involved even the US government.

Blakeney also created a state-owned oil and gas corporation, SaskOil, to handle oil exploration and production. The private oil industry had essentially abandoned Saskatchewan after the NDP's policy of imposing extremely-high royalty rates in the early 1970s. Canadian Prime Minister Pierre Trudeau's policies to centralize control in Ottawa outraged Blakeney, and he moved closer to Alberta's position of open hostility.

Blakeney joined Alberta Progressive Conservative Premier Peter Lougheed in a fight for provincial rights over minerals, oil, and gas.

Blakeney played an important role in the federal-provincial negotiations that led to the 1982 patriation of the Canadian constitution.

Later career
Blakeney's government was defeated in the 1982 provincial election, its attempt to win a fourth successive term, being defeated by the Progressive Conservative Party, led by Grant Devine. The NDP lost 35 of its 44 seats, then the third-worst defeat of a sitting government in the province's history. The party was cut down to only nine seats, its smallest presence in the legislature since its first election in 1934 (as the Saskatchewan CCF).

Once in opposition, Blakeney continued to lead the party up to the 1986 provincial election. The NDP not only regained much of what it had lost in its severe beating of four years earlier, but also gained more votes overall than Devine's Progressive Conservatives. However, much of that margin was wasted on landslide margins in Regina and Saskatoon, which left the NDP eight seats short of regaining power. Blakeney resigned in 1987 and was succeeded by Roy Romanow.

On April 30, 1992, he was appointed as an Officer of the Order of Canada for his work as Premier of Saskatchewan, his enormous contribution to the field of public administration, and a key player in introducing the first comprehensive public medical health care plan in Canada. In 2000, he was awarded the Saskatchewan Order of Merit. In 2001, he was made a Fellow of the Royal Society of Canada. Blakeney was also a past president of the Canadian Civil Liberties Association.

As a private citizen, Blakeney served as a consultant to the Romanow government in the 1990s, when it sold the SaskOil to Occidental Petroleum. Blakeney then served on the board of directors of the successor corporation.

Death
Blakeney died on April 16, 2011 at his home in Saskatoon of complications from cancer.

Federal NDP leader Jack Layton dedicated the rest of his federal election campaign to Blakeney, who died about halfway through the campaign. About 600 people attended his memorial, including federal NDP leaders Jack Layton and Ed Broadbent, former provincial premiers Roy Romanow, Lorne Calvert, Peter Lougheed, Ed Schreyer, Bill Davis, and Bob Rae, as well as then Saskatchewan premier Brad Wall.

Notes

References
 Allan Blakeney.  An Honourable Calling: Political Memoirs (University of Toronto Press, 2008) 258 pp. .
 * 
 

1925 births
2011 deaths
Deaths from liver cancer
Canadian Rhodes Scholars
Alumni of The Queen's College, Oxford
Lawyers in Saskatchewan
Canadian King's Counsel
Canadian socialists
Schulich School of Law alumni
Fellows of the Royal Society of Canada
Officers of the Order of Canada
Members of the King's Privy Council for Canada
Members of the Saskatchewan Order of Merit
People from Bridgewater, Nova Scotia
Premiers of Saskatchewan
20th-century King's Counsel
Saskatchewan Co-operative Commonwealth Federation MLAs
20th-century Canadian legislators
Saskatchewan New Democratic Party MLAs
Leaders of the Saskatchewan CCF/NDP
Deaths from cancer in Saskatchewan
Members of the Executive Council of Saskatchewan